The Farley family of Somerset pioneered news media in provincial England, with newspapers in Exeter, Salisbury, Bristol and Bath, principally published by Samuel Farley, Edward Farley II and Felix Farley; among whom Edward Farley II was made a veritable martyr for press freedom when he died in gaol prior to his scheduled release on account of being pardoned for defying the censor's ban on Jacobite literature.

Background

The Farley name is listed in England's Domesday Book and Adam Farlegh is the first of the name to be listed as a landlord in Somerset in the 13th century Hundred Rolls. Newspapers appeared in provincial England at the turn of the 18th century, with the Bristol Post Boy being the very first in print from 1702, albeit a basic two-pager. The patriarch of the Farley newsmen was Samuel Farley, who developed the concept with his Exeter Post Man, a many-paged newspaper in print from 1704. The governing Whigs came to see provincial newspapers as auxiliaries of the Tory opposition in London and in 1726 the Comptroller of the Post Office was mandated to establish surveillance, purchasing all English, Irish and Scottish newspapers for examination by the Treasury Solicitor. Thus began the 'print wars' in which Edward Farley II was an early casualty.

Samuel Farley

Samuel Farley (c. 1675-1730) published the Exeter Post Man from 1704 (which became the Exeter Mercury), followed by the Salisbury Post Man and Sam Farley's Bristol Newspaper (which became Farley's Bristol Newspaper). He published the Hague Letter in the 1720s and the Comptroller sought to censor it, but he kept it in print. The government lost the case for censorship in 1731 and ceased intervention in provincial newspapers until 1736.

Edward Farley II

Edward Farley II (c. 1705-1729) published the Jacobite Persian Letter in Farley’s Bristol Newspaper in the 1720s. Farley kept this publication in circulation despite the Comptroller and he was imprisoned for high treason. He petitioned Queen Caroline for his release and in turn the Attorney-General Philip Yorke (who became the 1st Earl of Hardwicke) issued a pardon for Farley, but he had an untimely death in gaol before his release, aged 24.

Felix Farley

Felix Farley (c. 1708-1753) published the Bath Advocate and Felix Farley, Rhymes: Latin and English by 'themaninthemoon', as well as Felix Farley's Bristol Journal, the latter of which was merged with a counterpart to become the Bristol Times in the mid-19th century. He was otherwise known for publishing the works of John Wood the Elder, notably The Origin of Building: Or, The Plagiarism Of The Heathens Detected, In Five Books.

See also

Freedom of the press
Farley (disambiguation)

References 

English families